Merimbun Lake is the largest natural lake in Brunei. It is located near Mukim Rambai in the Tutong District, about 70 km from the capital, Bandar Seri Begawan. The S-shaped lake is located 27 km from Tutong Town and it is surrounded by the 7800-hectare Tasek Merimbun Heritage Park.

Physical environment and facilities 
Tasek Merimbun is very dark in color; a phenomenon generated by tannin coming from leaves falling into the water. The lake supports a rich variety of fauna including birds, mammals, and reptiles. Visitors can hire a boat to take them around to explore the lake and its two islands. There is a small island in the center body of water that can be reached via a wooden walkway. Here, picnic pavilion facilities fashioned from logs enhance the enjoyment of this restful spot. Chalet facilities for researchers are available nearby.

ASEAN Heritage Park 
In 1967, the first Director of the Brunei Museums Department suggested Tasek Merimbun as a valuable asset and a potential Wildlife Sanctuary. A survey on Tasek Merimbun's bio-diversity and socio-economic activities conducted in 1983-84 led to the discovery of a rare White-collared Fruit Bat. This discovery was a major reason for the 29 November 1984 designation of Tasek Merimbun Heritage Park as the eleventh ASEAN Heritage Park.

Important Bird Area
The park has been identified by BirdLife International as an Important Bird Area (IBA) because its forest and freshwater wetland habitats support endangered Storm's storks.

See also
Protected areas of Brunei

References 

Lakes of Brunei
Tutong District
Protected areas of Brunei
Important Bird Areas of Brunei